Giovanna Melandri  (born 28 January 1962, in New York City) is an Italian politician. She was an MP in the Italian Parliament for 18 years (1994–2012) and held the positions of Minister of Culture (1998–2001) and Minister of Youth and Sport (2006–2008). She is the president of MAXXI, the National Museum of the 21st Century Arts of Rome, and the founder and chairwoman of the Human Foundation.

Early life and education 

Giovanna Melandri was born in New York City, United States.

She is married, has a daughter, and lives in Rome.

She graduated "cum laude" in political economy at the Sapienza University of Rome, and one of her teachers was Federico Caffè.

In October 2000, she was awarded the title "Grant of the Dignity of an Honorary Dame Commander of the Civil Division of the Order of the British Empire" by Queen Elizabeth the Second, and in July 2003, "Officier de la Legion d’Honneur" by the President of the French Republic, Jacques Chirac.

In February 2014, she was awarded "Architect ad honorem" by the Italian National Council of Architects, due to her work for the promotion of architectural quality.

Career 
From 1983 to 1987, she was a coordinator for the work group on industrial and technological politics at Montedison.

An environmental activist since 1982, Giovanna Melandri has been in charge of international relations for Legambiente (1988–1994). In that capacity, she attended the Bergen Conference on Sustainable Development in 1990 and was a member of the Italian delegation to the UN Rio summit in 1992.

In 1991, she became a member of the national secretariat for Democrats on the Left. She has been a deputy in the Italian Parliament since 1994. Melandri, who also holds U.S. citizenship, cast a vote for Barack Obama during the 2008 Democrats Abroad primary election. 

Between 1998 and 2001, she was minister of culture in the governments of Massimo D'Alema and Giuliano Amato.

On 17 May 2006, she was named minister for youth and sports in the second government of Romano Prodi.

In November 2012, she was appointed Chairwoman of the "MAXXI Foundation," the Italian National Centre for contemporary art, architecture, and design (www.fondazionemaxxi.it), by the Italian Minister of Culture.

She took over the leadership of the institution, along with its executive functions. During her presidency, she raised the budget and attendance to over 100% and established international cooperation with major cultural institutions.

MAXXI is now an honorary member of Altagamma, the foundation that gathers high-end Italian cultural and creative companies.

Since 2012, she has been the founder and chairwoman of "Human Foundation and Giving and Innovating" (www.humanfoundation.it), which promotes a new model of social economy in support of social business and social impact investment in Italy.

Muhammad Yunus, Jacques Attali, John Podesta, Gunter Pauli, Bunker Roy, Stefano Zamagni, Massimo Recalcati, Enrico Giovannini, Aldo Bonomi, and Francesco Starace, amongst others, are some of the members of the Advisory Board.

Human Foundation also works on training programs for social entrepreneurs and applies social impact evaluation models (i.e., social return on investment, or SROI). Human Foundation designs new financial tools (i.e., Social Impact Bonds) in cooperation with local and national governments (i.e., the Ministry of Justice). Giovanna Melandri is currently president of the Social Impact Agenda for Italy, an association of all stakeholders (social enterprises, banks, banking foundations, and others) involved in the social impact investment market in Italy.

Institutional activities 
From 1994 to 2012 she was a member of the Italian Parliament continuously. She was part of the Democratic Party's leadership and executive board from 1992 to 2013.

In the XII legislature (1994-1996) she was sitting in the Foreign Affairs Committee and was President of the Committee for Human Rights. She also supervised works of Childhood Special Committee. She was an active promoter of the law against sexual violence, and she promoted the first establishment of the parliamentarian intergroup on bioethics, which she coordinated for 2 years.

This group worked on cutting-edge issues (i.e., artificial reproduction, cloning, and biotestament).

In the XIII legislature (1996–1998), before being appointed Minister of Culture, she was a member of the Culture Committee. She proposed several bills on adoptions, bioethics, assisted reproduction, and the prohibition of extradition to countries that practice the death penalty.

She also proposed bills on publishing, telecommunications, and public broadcasting.

She represented Italy on the parliamentary delegation to the first World Forum on Television, organized by the UN in November 1997.

From 1998 to 2001, she was appointed Minister of Culture and Sport.

Under her responsibility, Italian cultural policies have received the largest share of public funding ever (more than 3 billion euros) and the first measures of tax incentives for cultural investment.

In those years, many cultural restoration sites were finalized thanks to the introduction of extraordinary sources of funding (i.e., lottery funds), and policies for contemporary art and architecture were initiated. A national bill establishing MAXXI was passed.

Jointly with the World Bank President James Wolfensohn and the First Lady Hillary Clinton, she promoted, in Florence in 1999, the international forum "Culture Counts: Financing Resources and the Economics of Culture and Sustainable Development."

She was invited in 2000 by US President Clinton as the European representative to the White House Conference on Culture and Diplomacy.

In the XIV legislature (2001–2006), she was a member of the Foreign Affairs Committee (she was also a member of the Italian Parliamentary Delegation at the Council of Europe and at the WEU).

She was a member of the Parliamentary Supervisory Board on RAI, the national Broadcasting TV.

She proposed several bills on cinema, the promotion of books and reading, and the protection and promotion of cultural heritage.

In the XV legislature (2006–2008), she was appointed Minister for Youth and Sports. In this capacity, she launched the program "Giovani idee cambiano l’Italia" in support of entrepreneurial ideas launched by people under 30; she launched the agreement with the ABI (Association of Italian Banks) for the program "Diamogli credito"; she established two new funds, a fund for youth policies, and a fund for sport for all.

She established, in agreement with the Minister of the Interior, Giuliano Amato, the first Young Committee for Interreligious Dialogue, and in 2005, she actively participated in the Alliance for Civilization promoted by the Spanish and Turkish prime ministers.

In the sixteenth legislature (2008–2012), she was a member of the VII Committee on Culture, Education, and Science, and she was a member of the Supervisory Board of the RAI, the national broadcasting TV.

Honors and awards 

 Honorary Dame Commander of the Civil Division of the Order of the British Empire (16 October 2000)
 Officer of the Legion of Honour (France; 19 September 2003—returned in December 2020)

References

External links

1962 births
Living people
American people of Italian descent
Politicians from New York City
Culture ministers of Italy
Women government ministers of Italy
20th-century Italian women politicians
21st-century Italian women politicians
Honorary Dames Commander of the Order of the British Empire